U.S. Route 45 (US 45) in the state of Illinois is a major north–south U.S. Highway that runs from the Brookport Bridge over the Ohio River at Brookport north through rural sections of eastern Illinois and then through the suburbs of Chicago to the Wisconsin state line east of Antioch. US 45 is the longest numbered route in Illinois.

Route description

Champaign/Urbana 
US 45 serves as the western boundary of the University of Illinois at Urbana–Champaign campus. Entering downtown Champaign as Neil Street, US 45 then goes east on Springfield Avenue, running concurrently with US 150. Farther east of downtown Champaign, it again serves as a boundary for the campus. Following Wright Street, US 45 then moves east on University Avenue, forming the northern border of the University. This path continues to Cunningham Avenue in Urbana. US 45 then turns onto Cunningham Avenue northward towards Chicago.

Kankakee to Hickory Hills 
US 45 overlaps US 52 at an intersection with Illinois 49 east of Ashkum.  US 45/52 intersects with Illinois Route 17 in Kankakee and Illinois Route 102 in Bourbonnais. Just west of Peotone, US 52 takes a westward course, and US 45 heads north. From this point on until its intersection with Cermak Road/22nd Street in Westchester, US 45 is also known as La Grange Road.

In Frankfort, US 45 intersects with US 30. During this stretch it intersects with Interstate 80 and US 6/159th Street in Orland Park. It also intersects Illinois Route 83 (Calumet Sag Road) for the first time in Palos Hills, just south of the Cal-Sag Channel.

Starting at 95th Street near Hickory Hills, US 45 becomes concurrent US 12 and US 20.  Two miles further north, at Archer, the road loses its 96th Avenue designation; this is due to the road entering suburbs that do not use Chicago's address system, and that most of its alignment north of Archer would be at 10000 W anyway, if the address system extended to these suburbs.

Hickory Hills to O'Hare International Airport 
The concurrent US 12/20/45, past 87th Street, briefly becomes a 4-lane freeway as it intersects with Illinois Route 171 (Archer Avenue) in Justice and Interstate 55 (the Stevenson Expressway) in Hodgkins (along with Interstate 294, which only has a southbound interchange ramp).  North of Interstate 55, US 12/20/45 becomes a regular 4-lane highway before it intersects with the former US 66 at Joliet Road in Countryside.

In Downtown La Grange, US 12/20/45 intersects the Burlington Northern/Santa Fe railroad tracks and intersects with US 34 (Ogden Avenue), possibly the only intersection of 4 separate US routes in Illinois.

Following the intersection with US 34, US 12/20/45 passes through La Grange Park (as La Grange Road), moving in a slight northwesterly direction.  After passing over Salt Creek, US 12/20/45 intersects with Cermak Road/22nd Street in Westchester and is known as Mannheim Road north of this intersection. Mannheim Road, as US 12/20/45 serves as the Eastern starting point for Illinois Route 38 (Roosevelt Road) in Hillside, has a full interchange with Interstate 290, also in Hillside, and serves as the Eastern starting point for Illinois Route 56 (briefly Washington Boulevard in Bellwood, before becoming Butterfield Road).

After passing over a Union Pacific rail yard, US 45 becomes concurrent with only US 12 in Melrose Park as US 20 breaks off at Lake Street there. US 12 and US 45 remain concurrent on Mannheim Road, passing Interstate 294 again without an interchange, but, after passing Illinois Route 19 (Irving Park Road), has a full interchange with Interstate 190, which leads directly to O'Hare International Airport or Interstate 90 East (into Chicago). This area between IL19 and IL72 once ran straight though but was realigned to the east in 1960 for the construction of O'Hare's 4R/22L runway.

O'Hare International Airport to Antioch 
Near the Northeast portion of O'Hare airport, US 12/45 intersects with Illinois Route 72 in Rosemont, IL, and continues along Mannheim Road into Des Plaines.  Mannheim Road ends and feeds into Lee Street at the end of an S-curve.  The northbound and southbound routes are split in downtown Des Plaines between Lee Street (West 12/North 45) and Graceland Avenue (East 12/South 45). During this time, US 12/45 intersects with US 14 (Miner Street) at two separate points, due to the separation of their directions.

Just north of US 14, US 12/45 are reunited in both directions on Lee Street, only to be separated as US 12 diverges onto Rand Road and US 45 becomes Des Plaines River Road in a complicated intersection on the north side of Des Plaines, just south of Illinois Route 58.

US 45 continues along Des Plaines River Road, intersecting with Illinois 58 in Des Plaines, and eventually becomes concurrent with Illinois Route 21, Milwaukee Avenue, in Prospect Heights, until Lincolnshire (just north of Illinois Route 22) where US 45 takes a northwest route.

US 45 also intersects with Illinois Route 83 just south of Mundelein (where they exchange routes, as IL 83 goes northwest, and US 45 continues north), Illinois Route 60 in Mundelein, Illinois Route 137 in Libertyville, Illinois Route 120 in Grayslake, and Illinois Route 173 just south of the Wisconsin border.

History
Initially, US 45 ran from Metropolis to Des Plaines, Illinois with some portions under construction. In 1929, a ferry that once crossed the Ohio River closed in favor of opening Brookport Bridge. By 1930, most of the sections were finished and then opened to traffic. The original alignment followed (from south–north) what used to be part of IL 1, IL 140, IL 25, IL 44, IL 51, and IL 46 before terminating at US 12. These state routes were eventually either truncated or removed as of 1935. That same year, US 45 was extended north from Des Plaines, Illinois to Michigan. In 1936, a new bridge crossing the Des Plaines River, Chicago Sanitary and Ship Canal, and the Illinois and Michigan Canal opened. As a result, US 45 moved off from another bridge carrying Willow Springs Road. In 1940, US 45 was rerouted to branch off west from Half Day instead of branching off north of Libertyville.

In 1954, a portion of US 45 south of Kankakee moved eastward, resulting in the extension of IL 115. In 1962, another portion of US 45 east of O'Hare Field moved slightly eastward. In 1969, a portion of Interstate 57 east of Kankakee was extended south to US 54 west of Onarga. As a result, US 45 moved away from Clifton and Chebanse.

In October 2019, the 4-lane Millburn Bypass opened in order to reduce congestion in and near Millburn.

Major intersections

References

External links

 Illinois
45
Transportation in Massac County, Illinois
Transportation in Johnson County, Illinois
Transportation in Saline County, Illinois
Transportation in Gallatin County, Illinois
Transportation in White County, Illinois
Transportation in Wayne County, Illinois
Transportation in Clay County, Illinois
Transportation in Effingham County, Illinois
Transportation in Cumberland County, Illinois
Transportation in Coles County, Illinois
Transportation in Douglas County, Illinois
Transportation in Champaign County, Illinois
Transportation in Ford County, Illinois
Transportation in Iroquois County, Illinois
Transportation in Kankakee County, Illinois
Transportation in Will County, Illinois
Transportation in Cook County, Illinois
Transportation in Lake County, Illinois